Tetanoceroides is a genus of flies in the family Sciomyzidae, the marsh flies or snail-killing flies.

Species
T. bisetosus (Thomson, 1869)
T. dentifer Zuska, 1974
T. fulvithorax Malloch, 1933
T. mendicus Zuska, 1974
T. mesopleuralis Malloch, 1933
T. patagonicus (Thomson, 1869)
T. simplex Zuska, 1974

References

Sciomyzidae
Sciomyzoidea genera